Midland Line may refer to the following rail lines:

Midland line, Perth, Western Australia, Australia
Midland railway line, Western Australia
Midland Line, New Zealand
Midland line (New Haven), Massachusetts, United States
Midland Main Line, between London St Pancras station, the East Midlands and Sheffield

See also 
 Midland Railway (disambiguation)
 Midland Railroad (disambiguation)